A housekeeper (also called necessary woman) is an individual responsible for the supervision of a house's cleaning staff. The housekeeper may also perform the cleaning duties themself.

History
In the great houses of the eighteenth, nineteenth and early twentieth centuries, the housekeeper could be a woman of considerable power in the domestic arena. The housekeeper of times past had her room (or rooms) cleaned by junior staff, her meals prepared and laundry taken care of, and with the butler presided over dinner in the Servants' Hall. Unlike most other servants, she was addressed as Mrs regardless of her marital status.

Today's head of household staff in a great house lives in much the same manner, although fewer households can afford large retinues of servants with an elaborate hierarchy. In some countries this is due to the minimum wage.

The housekeeper is generally hired by and reports to the lady of the house. The extent to which the housekeeper supervises other staff varies from household to household. In general, the staff of a grand dwelling is divided into departments, with the housekeeper in charge of all the female staff with the possible exception of the kitchen staff, who report to the cook, and the between staff, who may report to the butler; in these cases the cook and butler reported directly to the lady of the house.

In other households, particularly those of the very wealthy who maintain several residences, the housekeeper is the ultimate head of household staff and may hire and/or fire junior staff, subject to the approval of the lady of the house, and make recommendations for senior staff. In this case, the cook and butler report to the lady of the house through the housekeeper.

The housekeeper, also called a necessary woman, was a position in the UK's civil service and royal household. The duties were menial, housekeeping work such as emptying chamber pots.

Today's cook-housekeeper
In developed countries, fewer families can afford live-in help as they once did. Fewer hereditary grand households exist due to the World Wars, though a considerable number do exist in places such as the United Kingdom. Fewer families employ staff due to advances in technology and the lack of need due to social status.

In nations where there is still a ready supply of inexpensive labour, the middle classes may still be able to afford servants. For these households, the remnant of the once grand position of head housekeeper is often a cook-housekeeper. The modern cook-housekeeper performs cooking and cleaning duties.

In countries such as the U.S., the U.K., France and the European countries, there has been a rise in people employing domestic staff.

Fictional housekeepers
The following is a list of fictional characters who perform the role of a traditional housekeeper that supervises other servants.
Mrs Reynolds of Pemberley in Jane Austen's 1813 novel Pride and Prejudice.
Mrs Hodges of Donwell Abbey in Jane Austen's 1815 novel Emma.
Dorothy of Northanger Abbey in Jane Austen's 1817 novel Northanger Abbey.
Alice Fairfax of Thornfield Hall in Charlotte Brontë's 1847 novel Jane Eyre.
Nelly Dean and Zillah of Thrushcross Grange and Wuthering Heights in Emily Brontë's 1847 novel Wuthering Heights.
Mrs Medlock of Misselthwaite Manor in Frances Hodgson Burnett's 1911 novel The Secret Garden.
Mrs Twemlow of Blandings Castle in P. G. Wodehouse's 1915 novel Something Fresh.
Elizabeth Russell of Fernly Park in Agatha Christie's 1926 novel The Murder of Roger Ackroyd.
Mrs Danvers of Manderley in Daphne du Maurier's 1938 novel Rebecca.
Mrs Macready in C. S. Lewis's 1950 novel The Lion, the Witch and the Wardrobe.
Mrs Wilson of Gosford Park in the 2001 film Gosford Park.
Elsie Hughes of Downton Abbey in the television series Downton Abbey (2010–2015).

See also
Domestic worker
Footman
Household staff
Maid
Maid service
Nanny
Au pair

References

Domestic work
Cleaning and maintenance occupations